The Primera División de la Liga de Fútbol Femenino, currently known as Liga F (finetwork Liga F for sponsorship reasons), is the highest level of league competition for women's football in Spain. It is the women's equivalent of the men's La Liga, and it is organized by the Liga Profesional Femenina de Fútbol (LPFF). As one of the top six national leagues ranked by Union of European Football Associations (UEFA) coefficient, it is considered one of the most important women's leagues in Europe. Starting with the 2021–22 edition, as determined by the UEFA women's coefficient, the top three teams will qualify for the UEFA Women's Champions League.

The league was founded in 1988, and has operated every year since, although it has undergone several changes in format and names including; Primera Iberdrola (formerly Liga Femenina Iberdrola for sponsorship reasons), Superliga Femenina, División de Honor, and Liga Nacional. A total of 12 different clubs have been champions; Barcelona have won the most championships, with seven.

History

Liga Nacional
The league was founded in 1988 as Liga Nacional, formed by Olímpico Fortuna, Puente Castro, Parque Alcobendas, Santa María Atlético, Vallès Occidental, RCD Español, FC Barcelona, CE Sabadell and Peña Barcelonista Barcilona.

División de Honor
Starting in the 1996–97 season the league was divided into 4 groups. The group winners played a semi-final and final to decide the champion.

Superliga

For the 2001–02 season the league was renamed the Superliga and the competition system was changed from the group format to a double round-robin, with each team playing the other teams twice, once away and once at home. The league in this period consisted of 14 teams. The 2008–09 season kept the double round-robin format as the league increased from 14 to 16 teams.

In the 2009–10 season the Superliga increased from 16 to 24 teams, causing criticism by teams and players who feared a decline in the quality of competition. The Superliga was divided into 3 groups of 7 to 8 teams each, with geographically nearby teams placed into each group to minimize travel. In the first stage of the season, each team played each other team in its group twice. In the second stage, the best two of each group as well as the two best third-place finishers went into group A and the other teams were divided into groups B and C based on a predefined key. Again a double round-robin was played within each group. All Group A teams and the three best finishers of Group B and C qualified for the Copa de la Reina, and the two best teams in Group A played each other in a two-legged final for the season's championship. Rayo Vallecano won the 2009–10 and 2010-11 finals, both times against RCD Espanyol. In the 2009–10 season, two teams had to withdraw from the league for financial reasons.

Primera División
Starting in the 2011–12 season, the league was renamed to Primera División and the group-based system was eliminated; 18 teams played double round-robin to decide the champion. The size was reduced to 16 teams for the 2012–13 season. Before the 2016–17 season, the RFEF agreed to a sponsorship by Iberdrola, renaming the league Liga Iberdrola. This was slightly changed to Primera Iberdrola in 2019.

On 22 October 2019, following a breakdown of negotiations with the RFEF for a year over salaries and working conditions, the players went on a strike and a number of league games had to be cancelled due to the strike. On 18 November, the players announced that they would be lifting the strike, after reaching an agreement with the ACFF to resume negotiations for a new collective bargaining agreement.

In 2020 the Primera División was halted due to the COVID-19 pandemic.

On 10 June 2020 the Primera División was granted professionalised  league status.

Starting with the 2021-2022 season, the league became fully professional, and reduced from 18 teams to 16.

Teams

Stadiums and locations

List of champions
The following list shows all champions of the Spanish women's football league.
Before creation of the league, from 1983 to 1988 the Copa de la Reina de Fútbol winners were the Spanish Champions.

Performance by club

Since the inception of the Superliga

Overall

Marked in italic those teams that won the Copa de la Reina that season

All-time Primera División table

Liga Nacional (1988–1996)

División de Honor (1996–2001) 
Almost 100 clubs participated during the 5 seasons that this league format lasted.

Group stages

Final phases

Superliga (2001–2011) 
This table includes all games played since the 2001–02 season to 2010–11 season, when the Superliga recovered its format of a single group after several years with four groups and the group winners playing a Final Four. For a timeline of each team's league record, see List of women's football clubs in Spain.

Superliga 2001-2009

Superliga 2009-2011

Primera División (2011–present) 
As of 9 September 2022

Records 
Records in this section refer to Primera División from its founding in 1988 through to the present.

Clubs 
 Most appearances: 29 seasons, RCD Espanyol
 Most matches played: 739, RCD Espanyol
 Most wins overall: 440, FC Barcelona
 Most goals scored: 2022, Levante UD
 Most wins in a season overall: 33, FC Barcelona (2020–21)
 Most league goals scored in a season: 246, Levante UD (2000–01)
 Best win percentage in a season overall: 100% (28w-0d-0l) Levante UD (2000–01), 100% (30w-0d-0l) FC Barcelona (2021-22)
 Most points in a season overall: 99 (3 points for a win), FC Barcelona (2020–21)

Top goalscorer by season

All-time top-scorers

See also
Copa de la Reina de Fútbol
Supercopa de España Femenina
List of foreign Liga F players

Notes

References

External links
Official Website
La Liga Official Website
Superliga Official Website
Superliga Femenina on Futbolme.com
Superliga Unofficial Website
League at UEFA
Superliga at women.soccerway.com

 

 
1988 establishments in Spain
Sports leagues established in 1988
Spain
Football leagues in Spain